Looking for a Lady With Fangs and a Moustache is a 2019 Nepalese mystery drama film written and directed by Khyentse Norbu and starring amateur actor Tsering Tashi Gyalthang in the lead role. The film premiered at the 2019 Morelia International Film Festival.

Plot
While preparing to convert an abandoned Temple into a premier cafe, Nepalese entrepreneur Tenzin is warned by an elderly monk that he will soon die, unless he finds a particular dakini that has fangs and a moustache.

Cast
 Tsering Tashi Gyalthang as Tenzin
 Tulku Kungzang as Jachung
 Ngawang Tenzin as Monk
 Orgen Tobgyal Rinpoche as Master of Left Hand Lineage

Production
The film was written and directed by Khyentse Norbu, who wanted to "explore some of the last genuine residues of Tibetan mysticism". Max Dipesh Khatri and Rebindra Singh Baniya served as the film's producers, while Zhuangzhuang Tian, Olivia Harrison, Ram Raju, Aona Liu, and Kate McCreery were credited as executive producers. Norbu worked exclusively with non-professional actors and filming took place in Kathmandu.

Release
Abramorama secured the distribution rights to Looking for a Lady With Fangs and a Moustache. The film had its "virtual live premiere" on April 8, 2021, at the Rubin Museum of Art in New York City.

Critical reception
On review aggregator Rotten Tomatoes, the film has an approval rating of  based on  reviews. Metacritic, which assigns a normalized rating in the 0–100 range based on reviews from top mainstream critics, calculated an average score of 67 based on 4 reviews, indicating "generally favorable" reception. Dennis Harvey of Variety called the film "beguiling", while Michael Rechtshaffen of the Los Angeles Times found it "intriguing and distinctive". Film Threat reviewer Alex Saveliev likened the film to "an extended confession at a Buddhist temple". Threat Nicolas Rapold of The New York Times criticized the lead actor's "desultory" performance and added that "the drift of the filmmaking seemed to fall short of the transcendence envisioned by its story."

References

External links
 
 

2019 films
2019 drama films
2010s Nepali-language films
Films shot in Kathmandu
Nepalese drama films
Tibetan-language films
Films set in Kathmandu
2010s English-language films
2019 multilingual films
Nepalese multilingual films